Vajram is a 1995 Indian Telugu-language action drama film directed by S. V. Krishna Reddy and produced by C. Gowtham Kumar Reddy under the Lakshmi Padmaja Enterprises banner. It is a remake of the 1995 Malayalam film, Spadikam, directed by Bhadran. The film stars Nagarjuna, Roja, Indraja. The music was composed by S. V. Krishna Reddy.

Synopsis
Vajram is a story of young man, estranged from his narcissistic father, upon failing to meet the latter's high expectations for intellectual pursuits.

Plot
A school headmaster (K. Viswanath), is never happy with his son, Chakravarthy aka "Chakri" (Nagarjuna), and always degrades him. However, having had enough of him, Chakri runs away from home only to return as a gangster after long. What happens to him and his comeback effect to all forms the rest of the story.

Cast

Nagarjuna as Chakravarthy "Chakri"
Roja as Kuali
Indraja
K. Viswanath as Chakri's father
Gollapudi Maruthi Rao as G. M. Rao
Giri Babu as Chakri's uncle
Jard Andhoni 
Vallabhaneni Janardhan
Chalapathi Rao as Police Officer
Rami Reddy as Police Officer
Brahmanandam as Brahmam
Babu Mohan 
AVS as Brahmam's father-in-law
Tanikella Bharani as Constable
Mallikarjuna Rao 
Gundu Hanumantha Rao 
Ananth Babu as Chakri's assistant
Sakshi Ranga Rao 
Subbaraya Sharma 
Jenny
Sivaji Raja as Kota's henchman
Raja Ravindra as Madhu
Ashok Kumar as Doctor
Sujatha as Chakri's mother
Sri Lakshmi as Brahmam's mother-in-law
Seetha as Chella
Aleekhya
Rajasri 
Swathi 
Sugandha  
Master Tarun as Young Chakri

Soundtrack

References 

1995 films
1990s Telugu-language films
Telugu remakes of Malayalam films
Films directed by S. V. Krishna Reddy
Films scored by S. V. Krishna Reddy